See-Ward House, also known as The Old Brick House, is a historic home located near Mill Creek, Randolph County, West Virginia.  It is a two-story, brick I house with a gable roof in the Federal style. The house dates to 1801. Also on the property are a contributing shed, well, and barn site.

It was listed on the National Register of Historic Places in 1988.

References

Houses on the National Register of Historic Places in West Virginia
Federal architecture in West Virginia
Houses completed in 1801
Houses in Randolph County, West Virginia
I-houses in West Virginia
National Register of Historic Places in Randolph County, West Virginia